Ixopo High School is a boarding school in Kwazulu-Natal, South Africa.  It was founded in 1895 as the Ixopo Government School in what was originally called Stuartstown. The first black pupil was admitted for the 1989–90 school year after the crumbling Apartheid policies were swept aside by P. W. Botha.

Although the  " Ixopo Government School " was opened officially in August 1895, formal education in the village dates back to as early as 1878, when the township of Stuartstown (Ixopo's former name) was first laid out by the first settlers in the village.   In that same year, the enterprising village folk also founded the "Ixopo school and library Association", and built  a building on the land behind the present Agricultural Hall.

The first headmistress of the school was Mrs. J.T.  Shum, who taught for 17 years in the "Ixopo Government Aided School".

In 1895, the Natal Education Department was persuaded to assume full responsibility for education in the village and established the Ixopo Government School, with Mr J.W. Robinson as its first headmaster.

The original school building was built on the corner of High Street and Commercial Road, now one of the Primary School Hostels.  In 1920 the school moved to the site of the present Primary School.

In 1957 the High School moved to its present site with the official opening of the new school building. And a 3-floor building was built near the field, with two grounds – one on the top near the swimming pool and one at the bottom. The school offers sports such as rugby, hockey, netball, athletics, basketball  soccer, and other extramural activities.

There also experienced  teachers like Mrs Bame who have been teaching at the school for over 30 years.

Principal: Ms. K Barenschè

Boarding establishments

Cassington House
Cassington is the senior boys hostel. It was named after Mr Cassington, who owned a large farming estate of which the lower playing fields were part of that original estate.

Ellerton House
Ellerton is the junior boys hostel. The original boarding hostel was Ellerton House. Behind it are the original school buildings that composed the entire school block in a quad. Later on, after the Second World War, much of the school was built and extended to become as it was in 2010. As part of the extensions, a library was built that has been dedicated to the memory of Alan Paton.

Stuart House
Stuart is a girls hostel housing both junior and senior girls.

Sport

Rugby
During the Eighties and early Nineties, Ixopo became a feared name amongst the South West and Districts Rugby teams for their roughness and readiness to fight. This reputation often earned them top points for entire seasons and the "Third World War" matches against Maritzburg College would often become bitter and bloody fist-fights. It was the violence of inter-schools rugby that forced the national rugby board to change the rules of rugby during this period to the more gentle and gentlemanly game it has become today.

Cadets
Towards the end of the apartheid era, there were weekly sessions of Cadet Training for the young men. This was instituted throughout "white" government schools as a pre-requisite to forced conscription. Most boys would receive their call-up papers during their penultimate year of school and then either continue to university or join the army. Conscientious objectors were scorned and ridiculed. Even foreign pupils were given the same conscription orders by the South African Defence Force to fight in Angola or Namibia. Usually the first port of call was Oudtshoorn for training.

As a result of this conscription, the school had to train the boys how to march, shoot and defend themselves.

Headmasters and staff
The current headmaster is Ms Karen Barensche

Famous people
 Alan Paton, author of the book Cry the Beloved Country which was recently made into a Hollywood movie. He taught at the school until 1928 and met his wife, Dorrie Lusted, in Ixopo.
 Lawrence Bransby, author of many books (Downstreet and many others)

References

Boarding schools in South Africa
High schools in South Africa
Schools in KwaZulu-Natal